The 1976 State of the Union address was given by President Gerald R. Ford to a joint session of the 94th United States Congress on Monday, January 19, 1976.

The speech lasted 50 minutes and 38 seconds. and contained 4948 words.

See also
1976 United States presidential election

References

External links
(full transcript), The American Presidency Project, UC Santa Barbara.
1976 State of the Union Address (full video and audio at www.millercenter.org)

State of the Union addresses
Presidency of Gerald Ford
94th United States Congress
State of the Union Address
State of the Union Address
State of the Union Address
January 1976 events in the United States